A blueprint is a large-format reproduction, usually of an architectural or engineering plan.

Blueprint may also refer to

Computing and engineering
 Blueprint (CSS framework)
 Blueprint (engine), a technique for tuning an engine for maximum performance
 Blue Print (video game), a 1982 video game by Bally Midway
 Blueprint 3D, a 2011 puzzle video game
 Blueprints Visual Scripting, the visual scripting system in Unreal Engine
 blueprintjs, a React-based UI toolkit

Music
 Blueprint Records, record label, subsidiary of Voiceprint Records
 Blueprint (rapper)
 Blueprint (Ferry Corsten album)
 Blueprint (Rory Gallagher album) (1973)
 The Blueprint, a 2001 album by Jay-Z
 The Blueprint 2: The Gift & The Curse, a 2002 album by Jay-Z
 The Blueprint 3, a 2009 album by Jay-Z
 Blueprint (Natalie MacMaster album) (2003)
 Blueprints (Wage War album) (2015)
 Blueprint (Alice Bag album) (2018)
 "blue print", a song by P-Model from Potpourri
 "Blueprint", a 1987 song by the Rainbirds

Print media
 Blueprint (book), a 2018 book on human genetics by Robert Plomin
 Blueprint (magazine), an architecture and design magazine
 Blueprint (novel), a 1999 novel by Charlotte Kerner
 Blueprint (yearbook), the yearbook of the Georgia Institute of Technology
 Blueprint: Design Your Life, a defunct Martha Stewart magazine
 Blueprint Newspaper, a Nigerian daily newspaper

Other uses
 Blueprint (film), a 2003 German film by Rolf Schübel
 Blueprint Skateboards, a UK-based skateboard company
 Matt Morgan or the Blueprint (born 1976), professional wrestler
 Blueprint or lavender, a kind of reversal film
 Christchurch Central Recovery Plan, the plan in response to the 2011 Christchurch earthquake also known as the Blueprint

See also
 Shweshwe, printed cotton fabric, originally dyed indigo and known as blaudruck (German for "blue print")